Dries Buytaert (born 19 November 1978) is a Belgian open-source software programmer. He is the founder and lead developer of the Drupal content management system. He also serves as the CTO of Acquia.

Career 
Buytaert was born in Wilrijk, Antwerp, Belgium. He defended his PhD dissertation in computer science on 27 January 2008, at Ghent University in Belgium.

From 1999 to 2000 he was the maintainer of the Linux-WLAN FAQ.

On 1 December 2007, Dries announced, together with co-founder Jay Batson, the launch of a start-up called Acquia. Acquia is a commercial open-source software company providing products, services, and technical support for Drupal. Acquia tries to be to Drupal what Red Hat has been to Linux. In 2009, Acquia helped re-launch Whitehouse.gov on Drupal.

On 31 March 2008, Dries launched Mollom, a service dedicated to stopping website spam: "Mollom's purpose is to dramatically reduce the effort of keeping your site clean and the quality of your content high. Currently, Mollom is a spam-killing one-two punch combination of a state-of-the-art spam filter and CAPTCHA server." Over 59,000 websites are protected by the Mollom service, including all of Netlog's messages. Mollom support ended 2 April 2018.

In 2008, Buytaert was elected "Young Entrepreneurs of Tech" by BusinessWeek. He was also named to the MIT Technology Review TR35 as one of the top 35 innovators in the world under the age of 35.

Dismissal of Larry Garfield
In March of 2017, Buytaert fired Drupal developer Larry Garfield and disinvited him from DrupalCon, shortly after forum posts came to light that outed Garfield as a participant in the Gorean subculture. In a March 22 blog post, Garfield accused Buytaert of tolerating doxing and wrote that Drupal's Community Working Group had not found any Code of Conduct violations in his history. Buytaert made a post the next day which defended the firing as necessary for fostering an inclusive community. He also wrote that his precise reasoning was confidential and that he "did not make the decision based on the information or beliefs conveyed in Larry's blog post." Several commentators disputed this characterization citing Buytaert's deleted sentence "further participation in a leadership role implies our community is complicit with and/or endorses these views, which we do not." 85 Drupal developers posted an open letter criticizing Buytaert for his handling of the situation.

Personal life 
Buytaert lives in Boston.

References

External links

Personal website
Acquia
Mollom

Interviews
An In-Depth Interview With Dries Drupal Watchdog interview (February 2011)
Drupal founder, Dries Buytaert Interview CMS Critic interview (January 2009) 
Video interview  with Dries Buytaert by Noel Hidalgo in Antwerp, Belgium (26 July 2007)

Talks

DrupalCon Los Angeles 2015: Driesnote Keynote - Dries' talk at DrupalCon 2015 in Los Angeles, United States (May 2015)
The State of Drupal - Dries' talk at FOSDEM 2007 in Brussels, Belgium (February 2007)
Video of talk delivered by Dries Buytaert titled the State of Drupal from OSCMS conference on Yahoo campus in Sunnyvale, California (late March 2007)
The State of Drupal  - Dries' State of Drupal talk at Drupalcon 2007 in Barcelona, Spain (September 2007)

Free software programmers
Web developers
Belgian computer programmers
1978 births
Living people
People from Wilrijk
Scientists from Antwerp
Drupal